National Council of Social Welfare is an advisory body on social welfare to the Government of Pakistan established through a resolution in 1956.

References 

Government of Pakistan
1956 establishments in Pakistan